Oxford Junction may refer to:

Oxford Junction, Iowa, a city in Jones County
Oxford Junction, Nebraska, an unincorporated community in Harlan County
Oxford Junction, Nova Scotia, a Canadian rural community in Cumberland County